The 1994–95 IHL season was the 50th season of the International Hockey League, a North American minor professional league. 17 teams participated in the regular season, and the Denver Grizzlies won the Turner Cup.

Regular season

Turner Cup-Playoffs

External links
 Season 1994/95 on hockeydb.com

IHL
IHL
International Hockey League (1945–2001) seasons